The 1991 Dayton Flyers football team was an American football team that represented the University of Dayton as an independent during the 1991 NCAA Division III football season. Led by 11th-year head coach Mike Kelly, the Flyers compiled an overall record of 13–1, with their only loss coming in the national championship game against Ithaca.

Schedule

References

Dayton
Dayton Flyers football seasons
Dayton Flyers football